The Maronite Church is an Eastern Catholic sui iuris particular church in full communion with the pope and the worldwide Catholic Church, with self-governance under the Code of Canons of the Eastern Churches. The current head of the Maronite Church is Patriarch Bechara Boutros al-Rahi, who was elected in March 2011 following the resignation of Patriarch Nasrallah Boutros Sfeir. The current seat of the Maronite Patriarchate is in Bkerke, northeast of Beirut, Lebanon. Officially known as the Antiochene Syriac Maronite Church, it is part of Syriac Christianity by liturgy and heritage.

The early development of the Maronite Church can be divided into three periods, from the 4th to the 7th centuries. A congregation movement, with Saint Maron from the Taurus Mountains as an inspirational leader and patron saint, marked the first period. The second began with the establishment of the Monastery of Saint Maroun on the Orontes, built after the Council of Chalcedon to defend the doctrines of the council. This monastery was described as the "greatest monastery" in the region of Syria Secunda, with more than 300 hermitages around it, according to ancient records. After 518, the monastery de facto administered many parishes in Syria Prima, Cole Syria and Phoenicia. The third period was when Sede Vacante followed the Islamic conquest of the region and bishops of the Saint Maron Monastery elected John Maron as Patriarch circa 685 AD, according to Maronite tradition. The Greek Orthodox Church of Antioch reestablished their patriarchate in 751 AD. Other centers of historical importance include Kfarhay, Yanouh, Mayfouq, and the Qadisha Valley.

Although reduced in numbers today, the distinct but related Maronite ethno-religious group remains a principal grouping in Lebanon, with smaller minorities of Maronites in Syria, Cyprus, Israel, and Jordan. Emigration since the 19th century means that by about two-thirds of the Maronite Church's roughly 3.5 million members in 2017 were located outside "The Antiochian's Range", where they are part of the worldwide Lebanese diaspora.

Overview
The six major traditions of the Catholic Church are Alexandrian, Antiochene, Armenian, Chaldean, Constantinopolitan (Byzantine), and Latin (Roman). The Maronite Church follows the Antiochene Tradition. Any Catholic may attend any Eastern Catholic liturgy and fulfill his or her canonical obligations at an Eastern Catholic parish. Any Catholic may attend any Eastern Catholic parish or service and receive any sacrament from an Eastern Catholic priest since all belong to the Catholic Church. Maronites who do not reside within a convenient distance to a local Maronite Church are permitted to attend other Catholic churches while retaining their Maronite membership.

The Maronite Patriarchal Assembly (2003–2004) identified five distinguishing marks of the Maronite Church:
 It is Antiochene.
 It is Chalcedonian, in that the Maronites were strong supporters of the Council of Chalcedon of 451.
 It is Patriarchal and Monastic.
 It is faithful to the See of Peter in Rome.
 It has strong ties to Lebanon.

History 

Maron, a fourth-century monk and a contemporary and friend of John Chrysostom, left Antioch for the Orontes River in modern-day Syria to lead an ascetic life, following the traditions of Anthony the Great of the Desert and of Pachomius. Many of his followers also lived a monastic lifestyle. Maron is considered the founder of the spiritual and monastic movement that evolved into what is now the Maronite Church. Maronite Christianity has had a profound influence on what is now Lebanon, and to a lesser degree Syria, Jordan and Palestine. Saint Maron spent his life on a mountain in Syria, generally believed to be "Kefar-Nabo" on the mountain of Ol-Yambos in the Taurus Mountains, contemporary Turkey, becoming the cradle of the Maronite movement established in the Monastery of Saint Maron.

Following Maron's death in 410 AD, his disciples built Beth-Maron monastery at Apamea (present day Qalaat al-Madiq). This formed the nucleus of the Maronite Church. In 452, after the Council of Chalcedon, the monastery was expanded by the Byzantine emperor Marcian.

The Maronite movement reached Lebanon when St. Maron's first disciple, Abraham of Cyrrhus, who was called the "Apostle of Lebanon", set out to convert the non-Christians by introducing them to St. Maron.

The Maronites subscribed to the beliefs of the Council of Chalcedon in 451. Monophysites of Antioch slew 350 monks and burned the monastery, although Justinian I later restored the walls. Correspondence concerning the event brought the Maronites papal and orthodox recognition, indicated by a letter from Pope Hormisdas (514–523) dated 10 February 518. Representatives from Beth-Maron participated in the Constantinople synods of 536 and 553.

An outbreak of civil war during the reign of Emperor Phocas brought forth riots in the cities of Syria and Palestine and incursions by Persian King Khosrow II. In 609, the Patriarch of Antioch, Anastasius II, was killed either at the hands of some soldiers or locals. This left the Maronites without a leader, which continued because of the final Byzantine–Sassanid War of 602–628.

In the aftermath of the war, the Emperor Heraclius propagated a new Christological doctrine in an attempt to unify the various Christian churches of the East, who were divided over accepting the Council of Chalcedon. This doctrine, called Monothelitism, held that Christ had two natures (one divine and one human) but only one will (not a divine will and also a human will) and was meant as a compromise between supporters of Chalcedon, such as the Maronites, and opponents, such as the Jacobites. The doctrine was endorsed by Pope Honorius I to win back the Monophysites but problems soon arose (see his anathematization). Monothelitism failed to settle the schism, however, and was declared a heresy at the Third Council of Constantinople in 680–681. The Council condemned both Honorius and Patriarch Sergius I of Constantinople but did not mention the Maronites.

Contemporary Greek and Arab sources suggest the Maronites rejected the Third Council of Constantinople and accepted monothelitism, only moving away from it in the time of the Crusades in order to avoid being branded heretics by the crusaders. The Maronite Church, however, rejects the assertions that the Maronites were ever monothelites and broke communion with Rome; and the question remains a matter of controversy. Elias El-Hāyek attributes much of the confusion to Eutyches of Alexandria, whose Annals El-Hāyek claimed contain erroneous material regarding the early Maronite Church, which was then picked up by William of Tyre and others. Robert W. Crawford concluded the same, pointing out that the heretic "Maro" mentioned in the Annals, which William of Tyre considers as the namesake of the Maronites, was a Nestorian from Edessa and could not have been Maron or John Maron. However, Donald Attwater, 20th Century historian of Eastern Christianity, affirmed the view that Maronites broke communion with Rome over monothelitism, however briefly.

First Maronite Patriarch 

The Patriarch of Antioch Anastasius II died in 609, and Constantinople began to appoint a series of titular patriarchs, who resided in Constantinople. In 685, the Maronites elected Bishop John Maron of Batroun as Patriarch of Antioch and all the East.

In 687, as part of an agreements with Abd al-Malik ibn Marwan, Byzantine emperor Justinian II sent 12,000 Christian Maronites from Lebanon to Armenia, in exchange for a substantial payment and half the revenues of Cyprus. There they were conscripted as rowers and marines in the Byzantine navy. Additional resettlement efforts allowed Justinian to reinforce naval forces depleted by earlier conflicts.

John Maron established himself in the remote Qadisha Valley in Lebanon. In 694, Justinian sent troops against the Maronites in an unsuccessful attempt to capture the Patriarch. John Maron died in 707 at the Monastery of St. Maron in Lebanon. Around 749 the Maronite community, in the Lebanon mountains, built the Mar-Mama church at Ehden. Meanwhile, caught between the Byzantines and the Arabs, the monastery at Beth-Maron struggled to survive.

Islamic rule 

After they came under Arab rule following the Muslim conquest of Syria (634–638), Maronite immigration to Lebanon, which had begun some time before, increased, intensifying under the Abbasid caliph al-Ma'mun (813–33).

To eliminate internal dissent, from 1289 to 1291 Egyptian Mamluk troops descended on Mount Lebanon, destroying forts and monasteries.

Crusades 
Following the Muslim conquest of Eastern Christendom outside Anatolia and Europe in the 7th century and after the establishment of secured lines of demarcation between Islamic Caliphs and Byzantine Emperors, little was heard from the Maronites for 400 years. Secure in their mountain strongholds, the Maronites were re-discovered in the mountains near Tripoli, Lebanon, by Raymond of Toulouse on his way to conquer Jerusalem in the Great Crusade of 1096–1099. Raymond later returned to besiege Tripoli (1102–1109) after the conquest of Jerusalem in 1099, and relations between the Maronites and European Christianity were subsequently reestablished.

The Maronites assisted the crusaders and affirmed their affiliation with the Holy See of Rome in 1182. To commemorate their communion, Maronite Patriarch Youseff Al Jirjisi received the crown and staff, marking his patriarchal authority, from Pope Paschal II in 1100 AD. In 1131, Maronite Patriarch Gregorios Al-Halati received letters from Pope Innocent II in which the Papacy recognized the authority of the Patriarchate of Antioch. Patriarch Jeremias II Al-Amshitti (1199–1230) became the first Maronite Patriarch to visit Rome when he attended the Fourth Council of the Lateran in 1215. The Patriarchate of Antioch was also represented at the Council of Ferrara in 1438.

Peter Hans Kolvenbach notes, "This contact with the Latin Church enriched the intellectual world of Europe in the Middle Ages. Maronites taught Oriental languages and literature at the universities of Italy and France."

Ottoman rule 
In the Ottoman Empire, indigenous concentrated religious communities dealt mainly with the provincial administration. Officially, Maronites had to pay the jizya tax as non-Muslims, but sometimes the monks and clergy were exempt because they were considered to be "poor".

Fakhr-al-Din II (1572–1635) was a Druze prince and a leader of the Emirate of Chouf District in the governorate of Mount Lebanon. Maronite Abū Nādir al-Khāzin was one of his foremost supporters and served as Fakhr-al-Din's adjutant. Phares notes that "The emirs prospered from the intellectual skills and trading talents of the Maronites, while the Christians gained political protection, autonomy and a local ally against the ever-present threat of direct Ottoman rule." In 1649, Patriarch Yuhanna al-Sufrari placed the Maronites under French protection, and the French opened a consulate in Beirut.

The Khāzin sheikhs subsequently increased in power and influence. In 1662, with the mediation of Jesuit missionaries, Abū Nawfal al-Khāzin was named French consul, despite complaints by Marseille merchants that he was not from Marseille. The Church prospered from the protection and influence of the Khāzins, but at the expense of interference in church affairs, particularly ecclesiastical appointments, which the Khāzins saw as an extension of their political influence.

Bachir Chehab II was the first and last Maronite ruler of the Emirate of Mount Lebanon.

The relationship between the Druze and Christians has been characterized by harmony and peaceful coexistence, with amicable relations between the two groups prevailing throughout history, with the exception of some periods, including 1860 Mount Lebanon civil war.

The Maronite Catholics and the Druze founded modern Lebanon in the early Eighteenth Century, through a governing and social system known as the "Maronite-Druze dualism" in the Mount Lebanon Mutasarrifate.

French rule

Independent Lebanon

Synod of Mount Lebanon (1736)
Maronite orientalist Joseph Simon Assemani presided as papal legate for Pope Clement XII. The synod drafted a Code of Canons for the Maronite Church and created the first regular diocesan structure. The Council of Luwayza led to a more effective church structure and to gradual emancipation from the influence of Maronite families.

Latinization

Due to closer ties with the Latin Church, the Maronite Church is among the most Latinized of the Eastern Catholic Churches.

Contacts between the Maronite monks and Rome were revived during the Crusades. The Maronites introduced to Eastern Churches Western devotional practices such as the rosary and the Stations of the Cross. Late in the 16th century, Pope Gregory XIII sent Jesuits to the Lebanese monasteries to ensure that their practice conformed to decisions made at the Council of Trent. The Maronite College in Rome was established by Gregory XIII in 1584. The Maronite missal (Qurbono) was first printed between 1592 and 1594 in Rome, although with fewer anaphoras.

Patriarch Stephan al-Duwayhî (1670–1704), (later declared a "Servant of God"), was able to find a middle ground between reformers and conservatives, and re-vitalized Maronite liturgical tradition.

The Synod of Mount Lebanon sought to incorporate both traditions. It formalized many of the Latin practices that had developed, but also attempted to preserve ancient Maronite liturgical tradition. The Synod did not sanction the exclusive use of the Roman ritual in the administration of Baptism. However, in the Eastern tradition, the oil of catechumens is blessed by the priest during the baptismal rite. This blessing was now reserved to the Chrism Mass of Holy Thursday. A practice common among all the Eastern Churches is to administer Baptism and First Communion together. Unlike in other Eastern Catholic churches and similar to the Latin Church, Holy Communion is to be given only to those who have attained the age of reason; priests were forbidden to give Communion to infants.

In Orientale lumen, the Apostolic Letter to the Churches of the East, issued 2 May 1995, Pope John Paul II quotes Orientalium Ecclesiarum, the Second Vatican Council's Decree on the Eastern Catholic Churches:It has been stressed several times that the full union of the Catholic Eastern Churches with the Church of Rome which has already been achieved must not imply a diminished awareness of their own authenticity and originality. Wherever this occurred, the Second Vatican Council has urged them to rediscover their full identity, because they have "the right and the duty to govern themselves according to their own unique disciplines. For these are guaranteed by ancient tradition and seem to be better suited to the customs of their faithful and to the good of their souls."

Cardinal Sfeir's personal commitment accelerated liturgical reforms in the 1980s and 1990s. In 1992 he published a new Maronite Missal. This represents an attempt to return to the original form of the Antiochene Liturgy, removing the liturgical Latinization of past centuries. There are six Anaphoras.

Patriarch Sfeir stated that Sacrosanctum concilium and the Roman liturgical changes following Vatican II apply to the Maronite Church. Sancrosanctum Concilium says, "Among these principles and norms there are some which can and should be applied both to the Roman rite and also to all the other rites. The practical norms which follow, however, should be taken as applying only to the Roman rite, except for those which, in the very nature of things, affect other rites as well."

Organization

Patriarchate of Antioch 
The head of the Maronite Church is the Patriarch of Antioch and the Whole Levant, who is elected by the Maronite bishops and resides in Bkerké, close to Jounieh, north of Beirut. He resides in the northern town of Dimane during the summer.

There are four other claimants to the Patriarchal succession of Antioch:
 two other Eastern Catholic, also in full communion with the Papal Holy See of Rome :
 the Patriarch of Antioch and All the East, Alexandria and Jerusalem of the Melkite Greek Catholic Church (Byzantine Rite)
 the Patriarch of Antioch and All the East of the Syriacs of the Syriac Catholic Church (Antiochian Rite)
 two Orthodox :
 Eastern Orthodox Church, the Greek Orthodox Patriarch of Antioch and All the East, of the Antiochian Orthodox Church, in communion with the Ecumenical Patriarch of Constantinople
 Oriental Orthodoxy, the Patriarch of Antioch and All the East, Supreme Head of the Syriac Orthodox Church

Clerical celibacy is not strictly required for Maronite deacons and priests of parishes outside of North America; monks, however, must remain celibate, as well as bishops who are normally selected from the monasteries. Around 50% of the Maronite diocesan priests in the Middle East are married. Due to a long-term understanding with their Latin counterparts in North America, Maronite priests in that area have traditionally remained celibate. However, in February 2014, Wissam Akiki was ordained to the priesthood by Bishop A. Elias Zaidan of the U.S. Maronite Eparchy of Our Lady of Lebanon at St. Raymond's Maronite Cathedral in St. Louis. Deacon Akiki is the first married man to be ordained to the Maronite priesthood in North America and will not be expected to uphold a vow of celibacy.

Episcopates 
The Maronite church has twenty-six eparchies and patriarchal vicariates as follows:

Middle East 
 Maronite Catholic Patriarchate of Antioch see above

 Worldwide Immediately subject to the Patriarch
 In Lebanon:
 Maronite Catholic Archeparchy of Antelias
 Maronite Catholic Eparchy of Baalbek-Deir El Ahmar
 Maronite Catholic Eparchy of Batroun
 Maronite Catholic Archeparchy of Beirut
 Maronite Catholic Eparchy of Jbeil
 Maronite Catholic Eparchy of Joubbé, Sarba and Jounieh (sole Suffragan of the Patriarch of Antioch)
 Maronite Catholic Eparchy of Sidon
 Maronite Catholic Archeparchy of Tripoli
 Maronite Catholic Archeparchy of Tyre
 Maronite Catholic Eparchy of Zahleh
 In the Holy Land:
 Maronite Catholic Archeparchy of Haifa and the Holy Land, in Israel whose Archeparch holds the offices of Patriarchal Vicar of: 
 Patriarchal Exarch of the Maronite Catholic Patriarchal Exarchate of Jerusalem and Palestine in the Palestinian Territories and 
 Maronite Catholic Patriarchal Exarchate of Jordan in (Trans)Jordan 
 In Syria:
 Maronite Catholic Archeparchy of Damascus
 Maronite Catholic Archeparchy of Aleppo
 Maronite Catholic Eparchy of Latakia
 In Cyprus: Maronite Catholic Archeparchy of Cyprus in Nicosia
 In Egypt: Maronite Catholic Eparchy of Cairo

Elsewhere 
 Exempt, i.e. immediately subject to the Holy See:
 In Africa: Maronite Catholic Eparchy of Annunciation of Ibadan, with cathedral see being Church of Our Lady of the Annunciation, in Ibadan, in Nigeria
 In South America: Maronite Catholic Apostolic Exarchate of Colombia, with pro-cathedral see being Church of Our Lady of Lebanon, in Bogotá, in Colombia

Subject to the Synod in matters of liturgical and particular law, otherwise exempt, i.e. immediately subject to the Holy See and its Dicastery for the Eastern Churches:
 In Europe:
 Maronite Catholic Eparchy of Our Lady of Lebanon of Paris in France
 In North and Central America:
 Maronite Catholic Eparchy of Saint Maron of Montreal, in Canada
 Maronite Catholic Eparchy of Our Lady of Lebanon of Los Angeles in the United States (Central US, US West Coast)
 Maronite Catholic Eparchy of Saint Maron of Brooklyn in the United States (US East Coast)
 Maronite Catholic Eparchy of Our Lady of the Martyrs of Lebanon in Mexico in Mexico
 In Oceania: 
 Maronite Catholic Eparchy of Saint Maron of Sydney, in Australia

Suffragan Eparchies in the ecclesiastical provinces of Latin Metropolitan Archbishops; both in South America:
 Maronite Catholic Eparchy of San Charbel in Buenos Aires in Argentina, suffragan of the Archdiocese of Buenos Aires
 Maronite Catholic Eparchy of Our Lady of Lebanon of São Paulo in Brazil, suffragan of the Archdiocese of São Paulo

Titular sees 
 Four Titular archbishoprics (none Metropolitan): Cyrrhus of the Maronites, Laodicea in Syria of the Maronites, Nazareth of the Maronites, Nisibis of the Maronites
 Nine Titular bishoprics : Apamea in Syria of the Maronites, Arca in Armenia of the Maronites, Arca in Phoenicia of the Maronites, Callinicum of the Maronites, Epiphania in Syria of the Maronites, Hemesa of the Maronites, Ptolemais in Phœnicia of the Maronites, Sarepta of the Maronites, Tarsus of the Maronites.

Religious institutes (orders) 
 Lebanese Maronite Order
 Antonin Maronite Order
 Mariamite Maronite Order
 Congregation of Maronite Lebanese Missionaries

Population 

In the 12th century, about 40,000 Maronites resided in the area around Antioch and modern-day Lebanon. By the 21st century, estimates suggest that the Maronite diaspora population may have grown to more than twice the estimated 2 million Maronites living in their historic homelands in Lebanon, Syria, and Israel.

According to the official site of the Maronite church, approximately 1,062,000 Maronites live in Lebanon, where they constitute up to 22 -23 percent of the population. Syrian Maronites total 51,000, following the archdioceses of Aleppo and Damascus and the Diocese of Latakia. A Maronite community of about 10,000 lives in Cyprus with approximately 1,000 speakers of Cypriot Maronite Arabic from Kormakitis. A noticeable Maronite community exists in northern Israel (Galilee), numbering 7,504.

Diaspora 

Immigration of Maronite faithful from the Middle East to the United States began during the latter part of the nineteenth century. When the faithful were able to obtain a priest, communities were established as parishes under the jurisdiction of the local Latin bishops. In January 1966, Pope Paul VI established the Maronite Apostolic Exarchate for the Maronite faithful of the United States. In a decree of the Sacred Congregation for the Eastern Churches, Bishop Francis Mansour Zayek was appointed the first exarch. The see, in Detroit, Michigan, with a cathedral under the patronage of Saint Maron, was suffragan to the Archdiocese of Detroit. In 1971, Pope Paul VI elevated the Exarchate to the status of an Eparchy, with the name of Eparchy of Saint Maron of Detroit. In 1977, the see of the Eparchy of Saint Maron was transferred to Brooklyn, New York, with the cathedral under the patronage of Our Lady of Lebanon. The name of the Eparchy was modified to Eparchy of Saint Maron of Brooklyn.

In 1994, the Eparchy of Our Lady of Lebanon was established with the cathedral at Los Angeles, California, under the patronage of Our Lady of Lebanon. John George Chedid, auxiliary bishop of the Diocese of Saint Maron of Brooklyn, was ordained as the first Bishop of the Maronite Catholic Eparchy of Our Lady of Lebanon of Los Angeles at the Our Lady of Lebanon Cathedral in Los Angeles, California, where he served until he reached the mandatory retirement age of 80. In December 2000, Robert Joseph Shaheen succeeded Chedid as eparch.

Eparchies operate in São Paulo in Brazil, as well as in Colombia, México, France, Australia, South Africa, Canada and Argentina.

Former Brazilian president Michel Temer, the first Arab-Brazilian to have led the nation, was the son of two Maronite Catholic Lebanese immigrants.

Other 

 The Maronite Church awards medals, Great Crosses, and the Golden Order of the Maronite General Council of the Maronite Church.

See also 

 Charbel Makhlouf
 Cross of All Nations
 Kitab al-Huda
 Our Lady of Lebanon
 Phoenicianism
 Saint George in devotions, traditions and prayers
 St Thomas Christians

References

Bibliography

Further reading 
 Michael Breydy: Geschichte der syro-arabischen Literatur der Maroniten vom VII. bis XVI. Jahrhundert. Westdeutscher Verlag, Opladen 1985, 
 Moosa, Matti, The Maronites in History, Gorgias Press, Piscataway, New Jersey, 2005, 
 R. J. Mouawad, Les Maronites. Chrétiens du Liban, Brepols Publishers, Turnhout, 2009, 
 Kamal Salibi, A House of Many Mansions: The History of Lebanon Reconsidered (University of California Press, 1990).
 Maronite Church. New Catholic Encyclopedia, Second Edition, 2003.
 Riley-Smith, Johnathan. The Oxford Illustrated History of the Crusades (Oxford University Press, Oxford, 1995)
 Suermann, Harald. Histoire des origines de l'Eglise Maronite, PUSEK, Kaslik, 2010, 
 Barber, Malcolm. Letters from the East: Crusades, Pilgrims and Settlers in the 12th–13th centuries, Ashgate Press, Reading, United Kingdom, 2013,

External links 

 
4th-century establishments in Lebanon
Christian organizations established in the 4th century
National churches
Lebanese culture